Lina Marcela Rivas Ordoñez (born 24 April 1990, Chigorodó) is a Colombian weightlifter. She competed at the 2012 Summer Olympics in the women's 58 kg.  She competed in the same event at the 2016 Summer Olympics, finishing in 7th place with a total of 216 kg.

References

External links

Living people
Olympic weightlifters of Colombia
Weightlifters at the 2012 Summer Olympics
Weightlifters at the 2016 Summer Olympics
Colombian female weightlifters
Weightlifters at the 2015 Pan American Games
1990 births
Pan American Games medalists in weightlifting
Pan American Games bronze medalists for Colombia
World Weightlifting Championships medalists
South American Games bronze medalists for Colombia
South American Games medalists in weightlifting
Competitors at the 2010 South American Games
Sportspeople from Antioquia Department
Medalists at the 2015 Pan American Games
21st-century Colombian women